Međurečje is a village situated in Kraljevo municipality in Serbia.

References

Međurečje (Kraljevo)

Populated places in Raška District